Antimatter is material composed of antiparticles in the same way normal matter is composed of particles. 

Antimatter may also refer to:
 Antimatter (band), a UK art rock band
 Antimatter (album), a Cubanate album
 Antimatter (Star Trek novel), a Star Trek: Deep Space Nine novel written by John Vornholt
 "Antimatter", a song by Swedish metal band Dragonland from the album Astronomy
 "Anti-Matter", a song by American band The Aquabats from the album The Aquabats vs. the Floating Eye of Death! 
 Anti-Matter, a 1996 compilation album featuring the band 108
 Anti Matter, a 2017 film